Dima al-Shukr (born 1972) is a Syrian writer, critic and translator. She was born in Damascus. Her books on literary criticism include Prosody, Past and Present and Arabic Prosody in the 13th Century (Post Al-Khalil ibn Ahmad). As a translator from French to Arabic, she has translated the work of Régis Debray and Jean-Pierre Filiu. In 2022, her novel Where Is My Name? was nominated for the Arabic Booker Prize.

She lives in Paris.

References

Syrian writers
1972 births
Living people
Date of birth missing (living people)